Ayry-Tam (formerly Pervomayskoye) is a village in Jalal-Abad Region of Kyrgyzstan. It is part of the Ala-Buka District. Its population was 5,864 in 2021.

Population

References

Populated places in Jalal-Abad Region